Lipps is an unincorporated community in Wise County, Virginia, United States.

References

Unincorporated communities in Wise County, Virginia
Unincorporated communities in Virginia